The 2017 Overwatch World Cup was an Overwatch esports tournament, organized by Blizzard Entertainment, the game's developer. It was the second Overwatch World Cup and featured 32 represented nations from around the world, with the final tournament taking place at the Anaheim Convention Center from November 3–4, 2017.

The event had notably been controversial and criticized due to several issues, including China's visa denial, Twitch MVP voting, and redrawing of playoff matches. Twitch streams of the event accumulated over 5.4 million views.

The final took place on November 4 between South Korea and Canada. South Korea won 4–1, winning their second straight World Cup title.

Teams

Players and committees 
Each qualified region had three representatives form that region's Competition Committee. Blizzard chose a shortlist of candidates for each nation, in which the players and viewers of their respective nations voted from April 30 to May 5 on to become their nations committee. The committee members of each nation were announced on May 8. They players representing each country were selected by their National Competition Committee.

Qualification 
The top 32 countries/regions based on the average skill rating of the top 100 players from that particular country/region qualified for the tournament. Qualification began on March 29, and the qualified countries were announced on April 25. The top 32 national teams were seeded into eight groups spread across four different regions: Shanghai, Sydney, Katowice and Santa Monica, California. Each group played a round-robin schedule of matches. The top two teams in each group advanced to a single-elimination, one-game playoff bracket to qualify for the final tournament at BlizzCon.

Qualified by skill rating (32)

Venues

Group stage

Shanghai qualifier 

Source: OWWC

Sydney qualifier 

Source: OWWC

Katowice qualifier 

Source: OWWC

Santa Monica qualifier 

Source: OWWC

Knockout stage 

On August 28, brackets were drawn to determine the match-ups for the quarterfinals. The bracket draw was only announced after the final group stage, which is one of the reasons why many people believe that Blizzard added in a bracket draw to prevent team USA from playing South Korea in the quarterfinals as that was the match-up by default after the group stage. A week before the actual playoff stage, 4 out of 6 players in China's Overwatch World Cup team were denied from the tournament due to visa issues, receiving widespread criticism.

Quarterfinals and semifinals were both supposed to be played on Nov 3, but due to the quarterfinals games running later than expected, the semifinals games were moved to Nov 4, right before the final match.

Bracket

Awards 

{{xQC Most Valuable Player [MVP] }}

References

External links
Official website

Overwatch
Overwatch World Cup
Overwatch